The Young Republic League (LJR) was a French political party created in 1912 by Marc Sangnier, in continuation of Le Sillon, Sangnier's Christian social movement which was disavowed by the Pope Pius X (1835–1914). The LJR supported personalist socialism, on the model of Emmanuel Mounier's theory of personalism.

The Abbé Pierre was member of the party for a short time after leaving the MRP. Members of the LJR later joined the Union of the Socialist Left, the first movement including both Marxists and Social Christians.

See also
Marc Sangnier
Emmanuel Mounier's "Personalism"

Political parties of the French Third Republic
Socialist parties in France
Political parties established in 1912
1912 establishments in France